In algebra, a simplicial commutative ring is a commutative monoid in the category of simplicial abelian groups, or, equivalently, a simplicial object in the category of commutative rings.

A topology-counterpart of this notion is a commutative ring spectrum.

Examples 
The ring of polynomial differential forms on simplexes.

Graded ring structure 
Let A be a simplicial commutative ring. Then the ring structure of A gives  the structure of a graded-commutative graded ring as follows.

By the Dold–Kan correspondence,  is the homology of the chain complex corresponding to A; in particular, it is a graded abelian group. Next, to multiply two elements, writing  for the simplicial circle, let  be two maps. Then the composition
,
the second map the multiplication of A, induces . We have thus defined the graded multiplication . It is associative because the smash product is. It is graded-commutative (i.e.) since the involution  introduces a minus sign.

Module spectrum).

Spec 

See also 
E_n-ring

References 
What is a simplicial commutative ring from the point of view of homotopy theory?
What facts in commutative algebra fail miserably for simplicial commutative rings, even up to homotopy?
Reference request - CDGA vs. sAlg in char. 0
A. Mathew, Simplicial commutative rings, I.
B. Toën, Simplicial presheaves and derived algebraic geometry
P. Goerss and K. Schemmerhorn, Model categories and simplicial methods

Commutative algebra
Ring theory
Algebraic structures